Afon Wyre,, is a small river in the county of Ceredigion, Wales; also called Afon Wyre Fawr ("Great Wyre") and formerly Gwyrai. 

The river runs north from its source for about 1.5 miles or 2.5 km, through Lledrod, and then turns west for the bulk of its course (about 8 miles or 13 km), passing through Llangwyryfon and Llanrhystud (where it is joined by the Wyre Fach (Little Wyre) and Carrog) before emptying into Cardigan Bay.

References

External links 
Photos of the Afon Wyre and surrounding geography on geograph.org.uk

Wyre